The New Light of Myanmar (formerly The New Light of Burma) is a government-owned newspaper published by the Ministry of Information and based in Yangon, Myanmar.

The New Light of Myanmar is often viewed as propaganda on part of the Tatmadaw and the government, and features many articles about military officials. The majority of domestic news articles comes from the state-run Myanmar News Agency (MNA), whilst most international articles come from news services, particularly Reuters, which are published after censorship by the MNA.

History
The counterpart of the Myanmar-language Myanmar Alin, the New Light of Myanmar is claimed by its editors to be the oldest English-language daily, first published on 12 January 1964 as The Working People’s Daily. The newspaper took on its current name on 17 April 1993.

According to Bertil Lintner of The Irrawaddy, another New Light of Myanmar had been founded in 1914, published initially as a magazine before becoming a newspaper. It was managed by U Tin from 1920 to 1947. The newspaper was shut down by the military junta in 1969.

See also

List of newspapers in Myanmar
Mass media in Myanmar

References

External links
 

Daily newspapers published in Myanmar
Mass media in Yangon
Publications established in 1964
State media